Maureen Murphy (November 14, 1952 – August 9, 2008) was a politician in Illinois.

Life
Maureen Murphy was a lifelong resident of Evergreen Park, Illinois. She served on the Evergreen Park High School Board where she was elected in 1982 and as Worth Township Clerk from 1985 to 1989.

In 1988, she ran unsuccessfully for the Republican nomination for Cook County Recorder of Deeds, losing the Republican primary to Bernard Stone.

She was elected to the Illinois House of Representatives representing Illinois' 36th district from 1993 to 1997; while State Representative, she chaired the House revenue committee. Maureen Murphy also served as Worth Township Republican Committeeman. She is the mother of Jason, Shaun, Michael, and Matthew Murphy.

Murphy served as Chairman of the Cook County Republican Party from 2002 to 2004; she was the first woman to hold that position.

She also served as the 1st district Commissioner of the Cook County Board Of Review from 1998 to 2007. In her last two years of the board, she joined Joseph Berrios to block the reforms championed by its remaining member, Larry Rogers, Jr. On November 7, 2006 Murphy was defeated in her bid for reelection losing to Democrat Brendan F. Houlihan by a narrow margin of 2.4%.

During the 2008 Republican Party presidential primaries, Murphy worked on behalf of the presidential campaign of former U.S. Senator Fred Thompson as a congressional district chair for Illinois's 1st congressional district.

Maureen was the first woman, first Republican, and first suburban resident to serve on the Cook County Board of Review. Murphy developed lung cancer which would eventually take her life in 2008. She was succeeded by her son Shaun as Worth Township Republican Committeeman.  He briefly considered running for his mother's Board of Review seat.

References

1952 births
2008 deaths
Politicians from Chicago
Politicians from Cook County, Illinois
Deaths from lung cancer
Republican Party members of the Illinois House of Representatives
Deaths from cancer in Illinois
Women state legislators in Illinois
20th-century American politicians
20th-century American women politicians
Members of the Cook County Board of Review
21st-century American women